James Earl Rudder (May 6, 1910 – March 23, 1970) was a United States Army major general. As a lieutenant colonel, he commanded the historic Pointe du Hoc battle during the Invasion of Normandy. He also commanded the US troops at the Battle of the Hürtgen Forest, and led a series of delaying actions and ambushes during the Battle of the Bulge. General Rudder also at various times served as Texas Land Commissioner, the 16th president of Texas A&M University, third president of the Texas A&M University System, mayor of Brady, Texas, and a high school and college teacher and coach.

Military career

After attending John Tarleton Agricultural College and then graduating from Texas A&M in 1932 with a degree in industrial education, Rudder had been commissioned a second lieutenant of infantry in the United States Organized Reserve Corps. After being called into active duty in 1941, Rudder took part in the D-Day landings as commanding officer of the United States Army's 2nd Ranger Battalion.

His U.S. Army Rangers stormed the beach at Pointe du Hoc, scaling 100-ft (30-m) cliffs under enemy fire to reach and destroy a German gun battery. The battalion's casualty rate for this perilous mission was greater than 50%. Rudder himself was wounded twice during the course of the fighting. Though resistance was fierce, the Germans had removed the main armament from Pointe du Hoc in April 1944, and secretly constructed Maisy battery as the main heavy artillery position in the sector, which was left operational. In spite of this, Rudder ordered his men to dig in, and they fought off German counterattacks for two days until relieved. His men and he helped to successfully establish a beachhead for the Allied forces. The siege was replicated in the 1962 epic film The Longest Day.

By the time of preparations for D-Day, the Wehrmacht-run battery was marked on the Allied D-Day maps as a Rangers D-Day target - confirmed in records found in the early 21st century.[1]:150,161 Prior to D-Day, the Nazis had drawn significant attention to the gun battery at nearby Pointe du Hoc, a cliff top site overlooking the beaches, as compared to the slightly inland site of the Maisy battery. By the time of the invasion, Pointe du Hoc was manned by a token force of Wehrmacht troops, and the artillery pieces had been moved to other sites, replaced by dummy guns.

The batteries at Maisy were D-Day mission objective Number 6 as given to Colonel James Rudder in his Operation Neptune intelligence and US 1st Infantry Division orders. However, he did not brief his men to carry out the mission to Maisy. Historian Gary Sterne, in a book published in 2014, suggests that Rudder disobeyed orders calling on him to continue to Maisy after taking Pointe du Hoc. The Rangers stayed at Pointe du Hoc for some days until relieved, which kept them from completing their D-day orders and away from the Maisy site - as well as the D-day Phase Line which was their main target for the evening of 6 June.[1] This allowed the guns at Maisy to continue to shell troops in both the Omaha Beach and Utah Beach sectors for three days after the landings. Rudder always claimed that his orders called on him to hold the highway against a possible counterattack against Pointe du Hoc, but Sterne could not find any such order in the US National Archives.

Rudder didn’t alert his commanders that the guns were being removed from Pointe du Hoc and urge them to make Maisy and Grandcamp the primary targets instead. Rudder never told his men that the guns had been removed, either.

Seven months later, Rudder was reassigned in the middle of an assault to the 109th Infantry Regiment, which saw key service in the Battle of the Bulge. Rudder earned military honors, including the Distinguished Service Cross, Bronze Star  with Oak Leaf Cluster, Purple Heart with Oak Leaf Cluster, French Legion of Honor with Croix de Guerre and Palm, and Order of Leopold (Belgium) with Croix de Guerre and Palm. He was a full colonel by the war's end, and was promoted to brigadier general of the United States Army Reserve in 1954 and major general in 1957.

Political and academic career

Rudder served as mayor of Brady, Texas, for six years from 1946–52. In 1953, he became vice president of Brady Aviation Company. On January 1, 1955, he assumed the office of Texas Land Commissioner after Bascom Giles was convicted and sent to prison for defrauding veterans. At that time, the Veterans Land Board was under scrutiny for mismanagement and corruption. Rudder undertook the task of reforming policies, expediting land applications, and closely supervising proper accounting procedures. He also oversaw the proper leasing of state lands by employing more field inspectors for oil and gas sites and adding a seismic exploration staff. In addition, he improved working conditions for his staff and instigated a program to preserve the many deteriorating General Land Office documents.

Rudder won the 1956 state land commissioner election as a Democrat. He became vice president of Texas A&M University in 1958 and was named its president in 1959. He was president of the entire A&M System from 1965 until his death in 1970. In 1967, President Lyndon B. Johnson presented him with the Army Distinguished Service Medal, the Army's highest peacetime service award. Since his death in 1970, an annual service has been held in Normandy, France, in his honor.

While president of Texas A&M, Rudder is credited for transforming it from a small, all-male land-grant college to the university of today. Specifically, he made membership in the Corps of Cadets optional, allowed women to attend, and led efforts to integrate the campus. While the changes were hugely unpopular to the former students (it has been said only a president with Rudder's heroic military record could pull off such drastic changes), these changes freed Texas A&M to become the fourth-largest university in the United States.  Many reminders of Rudder are on campus, including Rudder Tower, next to the Memorial Student Center. A special training unit within the Corps of Cadets, known as "Rudder's Rangers", is named in his honor. Cadets within the Corps of Cadets at A&M are expected to be able to recite an excerpt from the inscription on Rudder Tower, a "Campusology" that reads:

Death
Rudder died on March 23, 1970, after suffering a cerebral hemorrhage. He was interred at College Station Cemetery.

Rudder was posthumously selected as an inaugural member of the U.S. Army Ranger Hall of Fame in 1992.

Tributes

 Earl Rudder Freeway — the portion of U.S. Highway 190/State Highway 6 (future Interstate 14) that runs through Bryan and College Station, Texas
 Earl Rudder Middle School —  in San Antonio, Texas
 James Earl Rudder High School — the second high school of the Bryan Independent School District opened in Bryan in August 2008; appropriately, the athletic teams are known as the Rangers
 James E. Rudder State Office Building — main public office of the Texas Secretary of State, 1019 Brazos St., Austin, Texas 78701
 J. Earl Rudder Tower and Conference Center — a 12-story building on the campus of Texas A&M University in College Station, Texas
 TS General Rudder — training ship for the Texas A&M "Texas Maritime Academy" at Galveston (2012)
 Camp James E. Rudder, subpost of Eglin Air Force Base, Florida, training site for the Florida phase of U.S. Army Ranger School
The Major General James E. Rudder Medal is awarded annually by the Association of the United States Army (AUSA) to an Army Reserve Soldier - serving or retired - whose career in the Army Reserve exemplifies the example of the Army Reserve Citizen-Soldier modeled by General Rudder.

References

 James Earl Rudder Papers – Texas A&M's Cushing Memorial Library Online
 2nd Ranger Battalion – How Much Of It Is Real? The Saving Private Ryan Online Encyclopedia
 
 Excerpt from: The VICTORS : Eisenhower and His Boys: The Men of World War II

Further reading

External links

1910 births
1970 deaths
United States Army Infantry Branch personnel
United States Army personnel of World War II
United States Army generals
United States Army Rangers
Chancellors of Texas A&M University System
Presidents of Texas A&M University
Texas A&M University alumni
Texas A&M University faculty
Commissioners of the General Land Office of Texas
Texas Democrats
Tarleton State University alumni
Tarleton State Texans football coaches
Mayors of places in Texas
People from Concho County, Texas

Recipients of the Distinguished Service Cross (United States)
Recipients of the Distinguished Service Medal (US Army)
Recipients of the Silver Star
Recipients of the Legion of Merit

Recipients of the Legion of Honour
Recipients of the Croix de guerre (Belgium)
Recipients of the Croix de Guerre 1939–1945 (France)
20th-century American politicians
Military personnel from Texas
20th-century American academics